Monastir Governorate is one of the twenty-four governorates of Tunisia. It is situated in north-eastern Tunisia. It covers an area of 1,019 km2 (393 mi2) and has a population of 548,828 (2014 census). The capital is Monastir.

Administrative divisions
The governorate is divided into thirteen delegations (mutamadiyat), listed below with their populations at the 2004 and 2014 Censuses:

Cities and towns
The following cities and towns are located in the Monastir Governorate:

Notable people
Habib Bourguiba

References

External links

 
Governorates of Tunisia